Angelina Camilla Jensen (born 23 May 1973) is a Danish curler from Kastrup.

Jensen has won two bronze medals in six attempts at the World Junior Curling Championships. She won her first bronze in 1993 playing third for Dorthe Holm and won bronze again in 1994 skipping. She had also played on the Danish team at the 1989, 1990, 1991 and 1992 Junior Championships.

Jensen played in her first World Curling Championship in 1994 throwing third stones for Helena Blach Lavrsen. Denmark finished 9th that year. Jensen would not return to the Worlds again until 2006, when she threw lead rocks but also skipped. Denmark finished in sixth place. At the 2007 World Women's Curling Championship, Jensen threw second rocks and skipped, and won her first medal at the Worlds- a silver when she lost 8–4 to Canada (skipped by Kelly Scott) in the final.

Jensen and her team represented Denmark again at the World Championships in 2008 finishing 7-4 for 5th Place losing a Tiebreaker to Japan, 2009 winning a bronze medal by defeating Canada's Jennifer Jones and 2010 going 6–5, But losing the Danish Final in 2011 and 2012

Personal life
Jensen works as an insurance claims correspondent for Alka Insurance. She has one daughter, Karolina.

Teammates
2010 Vancouver Olympic Games

Madeleine Dupont, Fourth

Denise Dupont, Third

Camilla Jensen, Lead

Ane Hansen, Alternate

References

External links
 
 2010 Olympics profile

1973 births
Danish female curlers
Living people
Curlers at the 2010 Winter Olympics
Olympic curlers of Denmark
Sportspeople from Copenhagen
People from Tårnby Municipality
20th-century Danish women